The Big Fellow (1959) is the last novel by Australian author Vance Palmer. It won the 1959 Miles Franklin Award.

This is the third in the author's Golconda trilogy of novels, following Golconda (1948) and Seedtime (1957).

Story outline

The novel continues the story of the Big Fellow, Macy Donovan, a politician in Queensland.  Now 50 he is about to take over the role of Premier as the incumbent, Wardle, departs for a cosy job in London.

References

Middlemiss.org

1959 Australian novels
Miles Franklin Award-winning works
Angus & Robertson books